Çaykənd (known as Kətişen, Ketashen or Ketishen until 1992) is a village in the municipality of Çovdar in the Dashkasan Rayon of Azerbaijan.

References

Populated places in Dashkasan District